Benjamin Bernard Boateng (born 22 November 2000) is a Ghanaian professional footballer who plays as an attacking midfielder for Ghana Premier League side Elmina Sharks.

Career 
Boateng started his career with Elmina Sharks in 2017.

References

External links 

 

Living people
2000 births
Association football midfielders
Ghanaian footballers
Elmina Sharks F.C. players
Ghana Premier League players
Smouha SC players
Al Ittihad Alexandria Club players